Squeezebox is a class of musical instruments including accordions and concertinas.

Squeezebox or Squeeze box may also refer to:

"Squeeze Box" (song), a 1975 song by The Who
Squeezebox (network music player), a digital audio streaming device
Hug machine or squeeze box, a therapeutic stress-relieving device
Squeeze box (magic trick), an illusion where the magician or his assistant has his head right next to his feet after entering a box that squeezes
A segment of the musical piece "Acadian Songs and Dances", composed by Virgil Thomson (1896–1989); from the film "Louisiana Story" of Robert Flaherty (1948)
Squeeze Box (box set), a 2017 box set release by American comedy musician "Weird Al" Yankovic
Colloquial reference to an Accordion